The National Association of Latino Fraternal Organizations (NALFO) is an umbrella council for 16 Latino Greek Letter Organizations (GLOs) established in 1998. The purpose of NALFO is to promote and foster positive interfraternal relations, communication, and development of all Latino fraternal organizations through mutual respect, leadership, honesty, professionalism and education.

History
Established in 1998, the National Association of Latino Fraternal Organizations, set out to become the uniting force for Latin-based fraternities and sororities. Latino organizations had developed in different parts of the United States in their early years, and this created difficulties for the organizations to find information on their peer groups in an effort to come together. As a result, two different umbrella organizations evolved, the ConcÌlio Nacional de Hermandades Latinas (founded by Phi Iota Alpha and Omega Phi Beta), which primarily consisted of fraternities and sororities on the east coast, and NALFO which primarily consisted of fraternities and sororities that originated on the midwest/west coast. In the winter of 2001 the two groups merged under the NALFO name and made history in developing one umbrella organization for all Latin-based fraternities and sororities.

Affiliate organizations

Former affiliates
Some other organizations have at one time been affiliated with NALFO.

See also

 List of Latino Greek-letter organizations
List of social fraternities and sororities
 Concilio Interfraternitario Puertorriqueño de la Florida
 National APIDA Panhellenic Association
 National Multicultural Greek Council
 National Pan-Hellenic Council
 National Panhellenic Conference
 North American Interfraternity Conference
Racism in Greek life

References

External links
 NALFO Website 

 
1998 establishments in Arizona
Student societies in the United States
Youth organizations based in Arizona
Hispanic and Latino American organizations
Organizations based in Tempe, Arizona
Supraorganizations
Organizations established in 1998